Colosseum Ridge is a ridge between Haskell Ridge and Richardson Hill in the Darwin Mountains. The ridge contains pyramidal peaks and five large cirques, the appearance of the latter bearing a resemblance to the Colosseum in Rome. It was mapped and named by the Victoria University of Wellington Antarctic Expedition (1962–63).

References

Further reading 
 UNITED STATES GEOLOGICAL SURVEY, GAZETTEER OF THE ANTARCTIC, 1989

Ridges of Oates Land